The Europe/Africa Zone was one of three zones of regional competition in the 2004 Fed Cup.

Group I
Venue: Athens Lawn Tennis Club, Athens, Greece (outdoor clay) 
Date: 19–24 April

The fourteen teams were divided into two pools of three teams and two pools of four. The top teams of each pool played-off against the second-placed teams to decide which four nations progress to World Group Play-offs. The four nations coming last played-off against each other to decide which teams are relegated to Group II for 2005.

Pools

Play-offs

Group II
Venue: Marsa, Malta (outdoor hard) 
Date: 26 April – 1 May

The nine teams were divided into a pool of four teams and a pool of five. The top teams of each pool played-off against the second-placed teams to decide which two nations progress to Group I for 2005. The four nations coming last played-off against the second-to-last placed teams to determine which teams would be relegated to Group III for 2005.

Pools

Play-offs

  and  advanced to Group I for 2005.

Group III
Venue: Marsa, Malta (outdoor hard) 
Date: 26 April – 1 May

The eight teams were divided into two pools of four teams. The top teams of each pool played-off against the second-placed teams to decide which two nations progress to Group II for 2005. The other teams played against each other to determine overall placings.

Pools

Play-offs

  and  advanced to Group II for 2005.

See also
Fed Cup structure

References

 Fed Cup Profile, Serbia and Montenegro
 Fed Cup Profile, Lithuania
 Fed Cup Profile, Great Britain
 Fed Cup Profile, Romania
 Fed Cup Profile, Norway
 Fed Cup Profile, Algeria
 Fed Cup Profile, South Africa
 Fed Cup Profile, Ukraine
 Fed Cup Profile, Israel
 Fed Cup Profile, Turkey
 Fed Cup Profile, Egypt
 Fed Cup Profile, Bosnia and Herzegovina
 Fed Cup Profile, Namibia
 Fed Cup Profile, Belarus
 Fed Cup Profile, Denmark
 Fed Cup Profile, Luxembourg
 Fed Cup Profile, Ireland
 Fed Cup Profile, Latvia
 Fed Cup Profile, Tunisia
 Fed Cup Profile, Malta
 Fed Cup Profile, Estonia
 Fed Cup Profile, Bulgaria
 Fed Cup Profile, Greece
 Fed Cup Profile, Georgia
 Fed Cup Profile, Finland
 Fed Cup Profile, Botswana
 Fed Cup Profile, Kenya

External links
 Fed Cup website

 
Europe Africa
Sports competitions in Athens
Tennis tournaments in Greece
Tennis tournaments in Malta
2004 in Greek tennis
2004 in Maltese sport